Albert Vann (November 19, 1934 – July 14, 2022) was an American politician and a member of the New York City Council from Brooklyn, representing the 36th district, which includes parts of Bedford-Stuyvesant and Crown Heights. He was a Democrat.

Early life and education
Vann was born to Nina (McGlone) Vann and Benjamin Palme on November 19, 1934, in Brooklyn, New York City; his parents had moved there from North Carolina during the Great Migration. He attended Franklin K. Lane High School and was in the United States Marine Corps from 1952 to 1955. After that, he earned a BBA from Toledo University in 1959, and later earned master's degrees from both Yeshiva University (in education), and Long Island University (in guidance counseling). He has served in different capacities as a teacher and administrator in New York public schools over the course of his professional career.

He was a member of Alpha Phi Alpha fraternity.

He was one of the founders of Medgar Evers College of the City University of New York, and was also one of the founders of the African American Teachers Association. Vann was a past instructor at Vassar College's Urban Center for Black Studies.

Political career

Vann was a member of the New York State Assembly (56th D.) from 1975 to 2001, sitting in the 181st, 182nd, 183rd, 184th, 185th, 186th, 187th, 188th, 189th, 190th, 191st, 192nd, 193rd, and 194th New York State Legislatures.

Vann exchanged seats with Annette Robinson after the New York City Council enacted a term limit. Vann was elected to the New York City Council in November 2001, and ex-City Councilwoman Robinson was elected to the State Assembly in 2002 to fill the vacancy. Both represented the 36th City Council District, and Vann remained in the City Council until 2013.

In the November 3, 2009 election Vann was challenged by Mark Winston Griffith (Drum Major Institute's executive director), who ran on the Working Families Party ballot line. Vann defeated Griffith and went on to serve until 2013, when term limits prevented him from seeking re-election. He was succeeded by fellow Democrat Robert Cornegy on January 1, 2014.

In response to the police shooting of Sean Bell in 2006, Vann alleged that the incident arose from "institutional racism." He then proceeded to mock the suggestion that African-American New Yorkers living in high-crime neighborhoods should adopt certain behaviors in order to avoid confrontations with police officers.

On October 23, 2009 Vann voted to extend term limits for the New York City Mayor and the City Council.

Personal life and death
Vann married Mildred Cooke in 1967, and they had four children. He was a resident of Bedford-Stuyvesant, Brooklyn, where he died on July 14, 2022, aged 87. An array of political figures memorialized him, including Letitia James, Eric Adams, Adrienne Adams, and Hakeem Jeffries.

References

External links 
 Official NYC Council Website about Albert Vann
2005 NYC Voter Guide: Candidate Profile: Albert Vann
District boundaries for 36th Council district
A Toy Gun, A Real Crime
Playing Race Card In Brooklyn

1934 births
2022 deaths
20th-century African-American educators
20th-century American educators
20th-century American politicians
21st-century African-American educators
21st-century American educators
21st-century American politicians
African-American state legislators in New York (state)
Educators from New York City
Long Island University alumni
Medgar Evers College people
Democratic Party members of the New York State Assembly
Military personnel from New York City
New York City Council members
People from Bedford–Stuyvesant, Brooklyn
Politicians from Brooklyn
United States Marines
University of Toledo alumni
Yeshiva University alumni